Julie M. Rogers is an American politician and physical therapist serving as a member of the Michigan House of Representatives from the 60th district. Elected in November 2020, she assumed office on January 1, 2021.

Education 
Rogers earned a Master of Physical Therapy from Marquette University.

Career 
Rogers has worked as a physical therapist for 22 years. She also served as a member of the Kalamazoo Board of Commissioners from 2013 to 2021. Rogers was elected to the Michigan House of Representatives in November 2020 and assumed office on January 1, 2021, succeeding Jon Hoadley.

References 

Living people
American physiotherapists
County commissioners in Michigan
Marquette University alumni
Democratic Party members of the Michigan House of Representatives
Politicians from Kalamazoo, Michigan
Women state legislators in Michigan
21st-century American politicians
21st-century American women politicians
Year of birth missing (living people)